Philip Montgomery (born December 21, 1971) is an American football coach and former player who is currently the offensive coordinator and quarterbacks coach at Auburn.  He is the former head coach of the Tulsa Golden Hurricane football team.

Career
Montgomery was hired by Tulsa on December 11, 2014. He was previously the offensive coordinator of the Baylor Bears. In 2013, Montgomery was a finalist for the Broyles Award, given annually to the nation's top college football assistant coach.  He played collegiately at Tarleton State University with the likes of Kevin Vickers, Ryland Bailey and Chad Martinka.  

In December 11, 2014, Montgomery was hired as the 33rd head coach at the Tulsa Golden Hurricane. In 2020, after a three year bowl skid, Tulsa made it to their first ever AAC Championship game against Cincinnati.

Head coaching record

References

External links
 Tulsa profile

1971 births
Living people
American football quarterbacks
American football safeties
Auburn Tigers football coaches
Baylor Bears football coaches
Houston Cougars football coaches
Tarleton State Texans football coaches
Tarleton State Texans football players
Tulsa Golden Hurricane football coaches
High school football coaches in Texas
People from Eastland, Texas
Coaches of American football from Texas
Players of American football from Texas